is a private university in Echizen, Fukui Prefecture, Japan, affiliated with the Jōdo Shinshū sect of Japanese Buddhism. The predecessor of the school was established in 1898, and it was accredited as a university in 2010.

References

External links
Jin-ai University

Universities and colleges in Fukui Prefecture
Private universities and colleges in Japan
Echizen, Fukui